The Kursk Constituency (No.109) is a Russian legislative constituency in the Kursk Oblast. In 1993-2007 the constituency covered Eastern Kursk Oblast, the cities of Kursk and Shchigry, but in 2016 Lgov constituency in Western Kursk Oblast was extended to Kursk and gained the name "Kursk constituency", while the territory of former Kursk constituency was placed into Seimsky constituency.

Members elected

Election results

1993

|-
! colspan=2 style="background-color:#E9E9E9;text-align:left;vertical-align:top;" |Candidate
! style="background-color:#E9E9E9;text-align:left;vertical-align:top;" |Party
! style="background-color:#E9E9E9;text-align:right;" |Votes
! style="background-color:#E9E9E9;text-align:right;" |%
|-
|style="background-color:"|
|align=left|Aleksandr Mikhaylov
|align=left|Communist Party
|
|19.50%
|-
|style="background-color:"|
|align=left|Gennady Merkulov
|align=left|Independent
| -
|11.00%
|-
| colspan="5" style="background-color:#E9E9E9;"|
|- style="font-weight:bold"
| colspan="3" style="text-align:left;" | Total
| 
| 100%
|-
| colspan="5" style="background-color:#E9E9E9;"|
|- style="font-weight:bold"
| colspan="4" |Source:
|
|}

1995

|-
! colspan=2 style="background-color:#E9E9E9;text-align:left;vertical-align:top;" |Candidate
! style="background-color:#E9E9E9;text-align:left;vertical-align:top;" |Party
! style="background-color:#E9E9E9;text-align:right;" |Votes
! style="background-color:#E9E9E9;text-align:right;" |%
|-
|style="background-color:"|
|align=left|Aleksandr Mikhaylov (incumbent)
|align=left|Communist Party
|
|34.53%
|-
|style="background-color:#959698"|
|align=left|Sergey Loktionov
|align=left|Derzhava
|
|23.05%
|-
|style="background-color:"|
|align=left|Larisa Piyasheva
|align=left|Independent
|
|14.11%
|-
|style="background-color:"|
|align=left|Igor Chukhrayov
|align=left|Agrarian Party
|
|6.84%
|-
|style="background-color:"|
|align=left|Yury Ruda
|align=left|Liberal Democratic Party
|
|4.20%
|-
|style="background-color:"|
|align=left|Nikolay Kolesov
|align=left|Independent
|
|3.60%
|-
|style="background-color:#F21A29"|
|align=left|Yulia Presnyakova
|align=left|Trade Unions and Industrialists – Union of Labour
|
|1.90%
|-
|style="background-color:#000000"|
|colspan=2 |against all
|
|9.79%
|-
| colspan="5" style="background-color:#E9E9E9;"|
|- style="font-weight:bold"
| colspan="3" style="text-align:left;" | Total
| 
| 100%
|-
| colspan="5" style="background-color:#E9E9E9;"|
|- style="font-weight:bold"
| colspan="4" |Source:
|
|}

1999

|-
! colspan=2 style="background-color:#E9E9E9;text-align:left;vertical-align:top;" |Candidate
! style="background-color:#E9E9E9;text-align:left;vertical-align:top;" |Party
! style="background-color:#E9E9E9;text-align:right;" |Votes
! style="background-color:#E9E9E9;text-align:right;" |%
|-
|style="background-color:"|
|align=left|Nikolay Ivanov
|align=left|Communist Party
|
|30.56%
|-
|style="background-color:"|
|align=left|Aleksandr Fedulov
|align=left|Unity
|
|14.45%
|-
|style="background-color:"|
|align=left|Nikolay Greshilov
|align=left|Independent
|
|7.80%
|-
|style="background-color:"|
|align=left|Sergey Falaleev
|align=left|Independent
|
|6.89%
|-
|style="background-color:"|
|align=left|Boris Suraev
|align=left|Independent
|
|6.66%
|-
|style="background-color:#E98282"|
|align=left|Galina Okorokova
|align=left|Women of Russia
|
|4.23%
|-
|style="background-color:"|
|align=left|Aleksandr Kozyavin
|align=left|Independent
|
|3.89%
|-
|style="background-color:"|
|align=left|Sergey Ivanov
|align=left|Liberal Democratic Party
|
|3.76%
|-
|style="background-color:"|
|align=left|Fyodor Ryzhkov
|align=left|Our Home – Russia
|
|3.30%
|-
|style="background-color:"|
|align=left|Sergey Loktionov
|align=left|Independent
|
|2.59%
|-
|style="background-color:#084284"|
|align=left|Vladimir Ryzhikov
|align=left|Spiritual Heritage
|
|2.59%
|-
|style="background-color:"|
|align=left|Yury Donchenko
|align=left|Independent
|
|1.24%
|-
|style="background-color:"|
|align=left|Yury Shumilo
|align=left|Independent
|
|0.33%
|-
|style="background-color:"|
|align=left|Vladimir Shprygin
|align=left|Independent
|
|0.29%
|-
|style="background-color:#000000"|
|colspan=2 |against all
|
|9.84%
|-
| colspan="5" style="background-color:#E9E9E9;"|
|- style="font-weight:bold"
| colspan="3" style="text-align:left;" | Total
| 
| 100%
|-
| colspan="5" style="background-color:#E9E9E9;"|
|- style="font-weight:bold"
| colspan="4" |Source:
|
|}

2003

|-
! colspan=2 style="background-color:#E9E9E9;text-align:left;vertical-align:top;" |Candidate
! style="background-color:#E9E9E9;text-align:left;vertical-align:top;" |Party
! style="background-color:#E9E9E9;text-align:right;" |Votes
! style="background-color:#E9E9E9;text-align:right;" |%
|-
|style="background-color:"|
|align=left|Aleksandr Chukhrayov
|align=left|United Russia
|
|26.18%
|-
|style="background-color:"|
|align=left|Nikolay Ivanov (incumbent)
|align=left|Communist Party
|
|20.65%
|-
|style="background:#7C73CC"| 
|align=left|Aleksandr Fedulov
|align=left|Great Russia–Eurasian Union
|
|18.31%
|-
|style="background-color:"|
|align=left|Sergey Ivanov
|align=left|Liberal Democratic Party
|
|6.49%
|-
|style="background-color:#FFD700"|
|align=left|Sergey Falaleev
|align=left|People's Party
|
|3.02%
|-
|style="background-color:#C21022"|
|align=left|Anatoly Kryukov
|align=left|Russian Pensioners' Party-Party of Social Justice
|
|2.54%
|-
|style="background:"| 
|align=left|Aleksandr Kapelyush
|align=left|Yabloko
|
|1.40%
|-
|style="background-color:"|
|align=left|Yelizaveta Dolgopolova
|align=left|Independent
|
|1.40%
|-
|style="background-color:#1042A5"|
|align=left|Yury Safonov
|align=left|Union of Right Forces
|
|1.32%
|-
|style="background-color:#164C8C"|
|align=left|Denis Yeshchenko
|align=left|United Russian Party Rus'
|
|0.72%
|-
|style="background-color:#000000"|
|colspan=2 |against all
|
|14.54%
|-
| colspan="5" style="background-color:#E9E9E9;"|
|- style="font-weight:bold"
| colspan="3" style="text-align:left;" | Total
| 
| 100%
|-
| colspan="5" style="background-color:#E9E9E9;"|
|- style="font-weight:bold"
| colspan="4" |Source:
|
|}

2016

|-
! colspan=2 style="background-color:#E9E9E9;text-align:left;vertical-align:top;" |Candidate
! style="background-color:#E9E9E9;text-align:left;vertical-align:top;" |Party
! style="background-color:#E9E9E9;text-align:right;" |Votes
! style="background-color:#E9E9E9;text-align:right;" |%
|-
|style="background-color: " |
|align=left|Tatyana Voronina
|align=left|United Russia
|
|42.02%
|-
|style="background-color:"|
|align=left|Nikolay Ivanov
|align=left|Communist Party
|
|11.62%
|-
|style="background-color:"|
|align=left|Vladimir Fedorov
|align=left|Liberal Democratic Party
|
|11.40%
|-
|style="background: "| 
|align=left|Olga Li
|align=left|Yabloko
|
|10.15%
|-
|style="background-color:"|
|align=left|Aleksandr Chetverikov
|align=left|A Just Russia
|
|7.96%
|-
|style="background:"| 
|align=left|Artyom Vakarev
|align=left|Communists of Russia
|
|4.09%
|-
|style="background-color:"|
|align=left|Aleksey Volkov
|align=left|Rodina
|
|4.04%
|-
|style="background:"| 
|align=left|Svetlana Sidorova
|align=left|Patriots of Russia
|
|3.01%
|-
|style="background: "| 
|align=left|Denis Khmelevskoy
|align=left|Party of Growth
|
|1.01%
|-
|style="background:#00A650"| 
|align=left|Alyona Kharlamova
|align=left|Civilian Power
|
|0.67%
|-
| colspan="5" style="background-color:#E9E9E9;"|
|- style="font-weight:bold"
| colspan="3" style="text-align:left;" | Total
| 
| 100%
|-
| colspan="5" style="background-color:#E9E9E9;"|
|- style="font-weight:bold"
| colspan="4" |Source:
|
|}

2021

|-
! colspan=2 style="background-color:#E9E9E9;text-align:left;vertical-align:top;" |Candidate
! style="background-color:#E9E9E9;text-align:left;vertical-align:top;" |Party
! style="background-color:#E9E9E9;text-align:right;" |Votes
! style="background-color:#E9E9E9;text-align:right;" |%
|-
|style="background-color: " |
|align=left|Yekaterina Kharchenko
|align=left|United Russia
|
|33.03%
|-
|style="background-color:"|
|align=left|Svetlana Kanunnikova
|align=left|Communist Party
|
|18.91%
|-
|style="background-color: " |
|align=left|Tatyana Bondarenko
|align=left|New People
|
|11.74%
|-
|style="background-color:"|
|align=left|Vladimir Fedorov
|align=left|Liberal Democratic Party
|
|10.39%
|-
|style="background-color: "|
|align=left|Irina Antsiferova
|align=left|Party of Pensioners
|
|9.43%
|-
|style="background-color:"|
|align=left|Pavel Lyulin
|align=left|A Just Russia — For Truth
|
|6.88%
|-
|style="background: "| 
|align=left|Dmitry Tolmachev
|align=left|Civic Platform
|
|5.48%
|-
| colspan="5" style="background-color:#E9E9E9;"|
|- style="font-weight:bold"
| colspan="3" style="text-align:left;" | Total
| 
| 100%
|-
| colspan="5" style="background-color:#E9E9E9;"|
|- style="font-weight:bold"
| colspan="4" |Source:
|
|}

Notes

References

Russian legislative constituencies
Politics of Kursk Oblast